Joanna Jane Agius (born 25 June 1958) is a Maltese archer. She competed in the 1980, 1984, and 1988 Summer Olympics. She was the first woman to represent Malta at the Olympics.

References

External links
 

1958 births
Living people
Archers at the 1980 Summer Olympics
Archers at the 1984 Summer Olympics
Archers at the 1988 Summer Olympics
Maltese female archers
Olympic archers of Malta